Mike Wasko (born June 9, 1964) is an American bobsledder. He competed in the four man event at the 1988 Winter Olympics.

Raised in Sayreville, New Jersey, Wasko competed in gymnastics and track at Sayreville War Memorial High School and was selected to the All State Team in both sports; before graduating in 1982; he was inducted into the school's hall of fame in 2005. He also competed in track during his collegiate career at Fairleigh Dickinson University.

References

External links
 

1964 births
Living people
American male bobsledders
Olympic bobsledders of the United States
Bobsledders at the 1988 Winter Olympics
People from Sayreville, New Jersey
Sayreville War Memorial High School alumni
Sportspeople from Bayonne, New Jersey
Sportspeople from Middlesex County, New Jersey